The 1985–86 Serie A season was won by Juventus.

Teams
Pisa, Lecce and Bari had been promoted from Serie B. They all will be relegated.

Events
Italy arrived at the top of the UEFA ranking.

Final classification

Results

Top goalscorers

References and sources

Almanacco Illustrato del Calcio - La Storia 1898-2004, Panini Edizioni, Modena, September 2005

External links

 :it:Classifica calcio Serie A italiana 1986 - Italian version with pictures and info.
  - All results on RSSSF Website.

Serie A seasons
Italy
1985–86 in Italian football leagues